A galette-saucisse is a type of French street food item consisting of a hot sausage, traditionally grilled, wrapped in a type of crepe called galette de sarrasin or Breton galette. The French region known as Upper Brittany is the traditional homeland of galette-saucisse, especially the department of Ille-et-Vilaine and some parts of its bordering departments like Côtes-d'Armor, Morbihan,  Loire-Atlantique, Mayenne and Manche.

First created during the 19th century, the dish consists of two landmark food items of the cuisine of Brittany. Buckwheat, introduced in Brittany during the 15th century and largely cultivated in the region, is the main ingredient of Breton galette and was a common substitute of bread in poor families. Pork sausage is one of the food specialties of the Rennes area.

Galette-saucisse is very popular in Upper Brittany, especially at outdoor public events, outdoor markets and sports games. It is strongly associated with the Stade Rennais F.C. football team, the dish being often eaten at the Route de Lorient Stadium during football games.

Description

Recipe 
The essential ingredients of the galette-saucisse are:
 a type of crêpe called galette de sarrasin made from buckwheat flour, a cuisine landmark of Upper Brittany
 a cooked pork sausage composed, as some specialists recommend, of 75 to 80% of pork meat and 20 to 25% of pork fat. The pork sausage can be salted and black pepper was traditionally used for the recipe.

The crepe itself is usually served cold, in order to protect eater's hand from the hot cooked sausage, but it can be warm when crepes are freshly prepared as consumers are arriving.

Dressing and toppings 
There is a strong opinion among Brittany people about the toppings and dressing that you can add to a galette-saucisse.

The canonical recipe of the galette-saucisse does not include any dressing, and the "French Association for the Preservation of the Galette-saucisse" recommends to not add any of them. Author of Galette-saucisse, je t'aime ! book Benjamin Keltz wrote that ketchup, mayonnaise and any other dressing are strongly seen as unacceptable. However, there was a time when black pepper was traditionally added to the recipe and some people do consider today that Dijon mustard is acceptable.

There is the same opinion about toppings. Sausage was historically just one of other items to be included in the galette. At the beginning of the 19th century, it was common that galette-saucisse was topped with caramelized yellow onions, a variety of dry onion traditionally produced in the French department of Manche.

See also

 List of buckwheat dishes
 List of sausage dishes

Footnotes

References

External links 

 Association de sauvegarde de la galette-saucisse bretonne , French organisation promoting the protection and preservation of the galette-saucisse 
 Video of the song "Galette saucisse je t'aime" 

Breton cuisine
Street food
Stuffed dishes
Buckwheat dishes